Werner Herzog (born 1942) is a German filmmaker whose films often feature ambitious, sometimes mad protagonists with impossible dreams. With works spanning myriad genres and mediums, he is particularly well known for his documentary films, which he typically narrates.

In 1962, Herzog made his directorial debut with the German-language short Herakles. His feature film debut—Signs of Life (1968)—garnered him the Silver Bear at Berlinale. Six years later, Herzog's The Enigma of Kaspar Hauser (1974) won the Grand Prix at the Cannes Film Festival. Starting in this period, Herzog collaborated with actor Klaus Kinski on five films, Aguirre, the Wrath of God (1972), Nosferatu the Vampyre (1979), Woyzeck (1979), Fitzcarraldo (1982), and Cobra Verde (1987). Fitzcarraldo won Herzog the Best Director Award at Cannes. His tumultuous relationship with Kinski was the subject of Herzog's 1999 documentary My Best Fiend. In 2006, he wrote and directed Rescue Dawn, starring Christian Bale. Three years later, Herzog directed Nicolas Cage in Bad Lieutenant: Port of Call New Orleans (2009). He has directed a number of other fictional feature films as well as shorts.

One of Herzog's earliest documentaries was 1971's Fata Morgana, which pairs footage of African desert landscapes with a recitation of the Mayan creation myth, the Popol Vuh. In 1992, Herzog documented Kuwait in the wake of the Gulf War in his Lessons of Darkness. He directed the 2005 documentary Grizzly Man, which recounts the life and death of Timothy Treadwell. His 2007 film Encounters at the End of the World documents the lives of scientists in Antarctica. In 2016, he directed two documentaries, Into the Inferno and Lo and Behold. For his 2018 documentary Meeting Gorbachev, Herzog had extensive interviews with the Soviet leader. In 2020, he co-directed Fireball, an exploration of meteorites. He has directed dozens of other documentaries, including shorts and television segments.

Herzog has appeared in various other projects as well. In 1980, he was documented eating his shoe in Werner Herzog Eats His Shoe after losing a bet. Herzog has also acted in commercial films and television series. He portrayed the antagonist in the 2012 Tom Cruise film Jack Reacher, and, in 2019, he appeared as a secondary villain in The Mandalorian. He has also had cameo appearances in The Simpsons, Parks and Recreation, and other television series.

Directorial works

Fiction feature films

Fiction short films

Documentary feature films

Documentary short films

Television series

Other work

Film

Television

References

Citations

External links
 

Director filmographies
German filmographies
Male actor filmographies
Filmography